Sebastião Wolf (5 February 1869 – 15 March 1936) was a Brazilian sport shooter who competed in the 1920 Summer Olympics. In 1920 he won the bronze medal with the Brazilian team in the team 50 metre free pistol competition.

In the 1920 Summer Olympics he also participated in the following events:

 Team 30 metre military pistol - fourth place
 50 metre free pistol - place unknown

References

External links
profile

1869 births
1936 deaths
Brazilian male sport shooters
ISSF pistol shooters
Olympic shooters of Brazil
Shooters at the 1920 Summer Olympics
Olympic bronze medalists for Brazil
Brazilian people of German descent
Olympic medalists in shooting
Medalists at the 1920 Summer Olympics
19th-century Brazilian people
20th-century Brazilian people